The Man in Search of Himself is a 1950 West German comedy crime film directed by Géza von Cziffra and starring Vera Molnar, Wolf Albach-Retty and Petra Trautmann.

The film's sets were designed by the art director Herbert Kirchhoff. It was shot on location in Hamburg, the Bavarian Alps, and the French Riviera.

Cast
Vera Molnar as Victoria Miller
Wolf Albach-Retty as Marius Aldon
Petra Trautmann as Jeanette
Karl Schönböck as Jack d'Alimonte
Paul Kemp as Theobald Finger
Hans Leibelt as Mr. Miller
Hubert von Meyerinck as Director Cattoni
Bobby Todd as Sandro, Portier
Rudolf Platte as Samba-Heini
Rita Paul as bar singer
Peter Field
Michael Jary as Pianist
Nicolas Koline
Adalbert Kriwat
Wolfgang Neuss
Joseph Offenbach
Carl Voscherau

References

External links

1950s crime comedy films
German crime comedy films
West German films
Films directed by Géza von Cziffra
1950 comedy films
German black-and-white films
1950s German films